James Buchan Graham (23 April 1884 – 15 May 1941) was a New Zealand rugby union player. A loose forward, Graham represented  at a provincial level, and was a member of the New Zealand national side, the All Blacks, in 1913 and 1914. He played 16 matches for the All Blacks including three internationals.

References

1884 births
1941 deaths
Rugby union players from Dunedin
New Zealand rugby union players
New Zealand international rugby union players
Otago rugby union players
Rugby union flankers